Deanside railway station was a short-lived railway station that served the suburb of Hillington, Glasgow, Scotland from 1903 to 1905 on the Glasgow and Renfrew District Railway.

History 
The station opened in 1903 by the Glasgow and Renfrew District Railway. The signal box was to the east of the line. There was a siding, called the Clyde Trust Siding, to the north west which served Renfrew Harbour. Deanside Depot was accessed by the reverse siding and was situated on the north side of Old Renfrew Road. The station closed in 1905.

References

External links 

Disused railway stations in Renfrewshire
Railway stations in Great Britain opened in 1903
Railway stations in Great Britain closed in 1905
1903 establishments in Scotland
1905 disestablishments in Scotland